The 2017–18 season is Club Atlético Independiente's 5th consecutive season in the top-flight of Argentine football. The season covers the period from 1 July 2017 to 30 June 2018.

Current squad
.

Out on loan

Transfers

In

Out

Loan in

Loan out

Pre-season and friendlies

Friendlies

Torneos de Verano

Competitions

Overview

Primera División

Standings

Results by round

Matchday

Copa Argentina

Round of 64

Round of 32

Copa Sudamericana

First stage

Second stage

Round of 16

Quarter-finals

Semi-finals

Finals

Recopa Sudamericana

Copa Libertadores

Group stage

Notes

References

Club Atlético Independiente seasons
Independiente